Robert Scotellaro is an American writer and poet  known for his flash fiction.

His flash fiction has appeared in such publications as Flash: The International Short-Short Story Magazine  Blink Ink  and the New Flash Fiction Review. Reviews and articles about his work have appeared in the San Francisco Chronicle and Writer's Digest.

Collections
What Are the Chances? (2020)
Nothing Is Ever One Thing (2019)
New Micro (2018)
Bad Motel (2016)
What We Know So Far (2015)
Measuring the Distance (2012)
The Night Sings A Cappella (2011)
Rhapsody of Fallen Objects  (2010)

Children's Books
The Terrible Storm (2016)
Snail Stampede and Other Poems (2004)
Dancing with Frankenstein and Other Limericks (2003)
Daddy Fixed the Vacuum Cleaner (1993)

Poetry
The Night Sings A  Capella (2011)
Rhapsody of Fallen Objects (2010)
My Father's Cadillac (1984)
Early Love Poems of Genghis Kahn (1979)
Blinded by Halos (1978)
East Harlem Poems  (1977)

External links
 Robert Scotellaro, author's official homepage

References

Living people
American male writers
Year of birth missing (living people)
Place of birth missing (living people)